Regina Irman (born 22 March 1957) is a Swiss musician, music educator and composer.

Early life
Regina Irman was born in Winterthur, Switzerland. In 1976 she studied music at the Winterthur Conservatory, and in 1982 received her teacher's diploma with guitar as principal instrument. She also began to study percussion, and in 1995 received a concert diploma with distinction for percussion.
 
Her first compositions were made while she was studying the guitar, and after 1983 she composed for a number of commissions, including the city of Zurich, the cultural foundation Pro Helvetia, the Women's Congress of Bern, the Swiss Youth Music Competition, and various ensembles. She spent a sabbatical year in Zurich, and has performed in Switzerland, Germany, Italy, France and Ukraine. She also works as a drummer and instrumental teacher. She is a lecturer at the Pädagogischen Hochschule Thurgau.

Works
Irman has composed solo pieces, chamber music, choral works, and for music theater.

Selected works include:

Hill at Ceret (1983) for 2 violas and double bass
Speculum (1984) for 4 clarinets in Eb, percussion (2), Sisyphus machine, mirrors and colored lights backdrop
From reflective ice (1984) for four clarinets
Floor (los) (1985) for three violins
Melody 1 (1985) for quarter-tone guitar or other instruments with a clear intonation possibility
Melody 2 (1985) for Untertonflöte or other instruments
A dada = foreign songs sheet (1985–1986) Based on texts by Adolf Wolfli (mezzo-soprano) and piano
Piano songs, which deal with misunderstanding of the Swiss.
Wind Chimes (1986) for piano
Numbers (1986) for piano
A Funeral March (1987) trio for percussion and spoken voice
Black Happiness (1988–1989) for partially prepared piano
Passacaglia (1989–1990) for Clarinet in A
Chopin in the vertical (1991) for speaker, piano, timpani and tapes
Requiem to the Death "(1991-1993) for 25 women's voices, text: Akhmatova
Masquerade (1993)Eight pieces for mixed choir
Mirror Dance (1993) for 2 recorders and drums
Words (1995) Saxophone Ensemble and percussion
Association Office (1995) for solo percussion (chimes, cymbals and metal objects)
"... Like a grasshopper on the seas ..." (1995–1996) for large mixed chorus and tape strips
Table with bird feet (1996) for tape alone
Five speech-sound-objects (1996) for solo percussion (vibraphone, percussion Klein, speaking) Based on texts by Sonja Sekula.
Subjects (1996) for piano four hands
Three Dances (1996–1997) for soprano, speaking voice/ piano, clarinet and accordion Text: Anna Akhmatova
Sculptures (for Bruce Naumann) (1997) for quarter-tone-viol quartet
Otto mane (1999) for speaker, soprano, piano and bass drum text: ETA Hoffmann
Orfeo (1999–2000) for 5 players (also version for tape)
Surdina (1999–2000) for alto solo Texts: Cecilia Meireles
Black happiness 2 (1990–2001) for percussion quartet
Landscapes (2003) Five Pieces for percussion sextet 1. Snow landscape, 2. Frost flowers, 3. Mechanical landscape, cut up, 4. Eisgitter, amorphous, 5. Mechanical landscape, rotating
Ten short pieces based on themes by Bach and Biber (2004) for (baroque) violin solo
According to Fields (2006–2007) for 8 women's voices with percussion and light sources
Lines (2006–2007) for 2 soprano trombones and 2 alto trombones

References

1957 births
20th-century classical composers
Swiss music educators
Women classical composers
Living people
Swiss classical composers
Women music educators
20th-century women composers
20th-century Swiss composers